A postmaster is the head of an individual post office.

Postmaster may also refer to:
Postmaster (computing), the administrator of an email server
Postmaster, a senior undergraduate scholar of Merton College, Oxford (Latin portionista; as opposed to a junior undergraduate scholar, known as an Exhibitioner)
Operation Postmaster, a British WW2 clandestine military action
Der Postmeister, or The Postmaster, 1940 German film
Postmaster (film), a 2016 Bengali film
Postmaster (occupation), an individual who let horses, riders (postilions) and handled other business from a post house